Baker Boys is a British television drama series, produced by BBC Wales and broadcast on BBC One Wales. The series was written by Helen Raynor and Gary Owen. Torchwood creator Russell T Davies also had a role as creative consultant, which he fulfilled from Los Angeles. The first episode of the series was broadcast on 23 January 2011.

The programme follows the workers of Valley Bara bakery which is the economic centre of Trefynydd, a small fictional village in South Wales. Generations of people had earned a living and formed a life at the bakery but this is thrown into jeopardy when recession bites and the bakery workers find themselves unemployed overnight. Writer Helen Raynor describes it as "a blue collar drama", explaining "we wanted to tell the story of a community, with a workplace at the centre of it, who suddenly fall on hard times". The show is filmed and set in Trethomas (a village in Caerphilly), Bedwas (a village in Caerphilly) and Caerphilly.

Cast

Episodes

Series one

Series two

Reception

Welsh newspaper The Western Mail responded positively to the series, with journalist Karen Price describing it as "a poignant drama, which will strike a chord with so many people, particularly in these times of recession". Scott Matthewman, writing for The Stage also praised the use of economic and social themes and expressed a desire to see a UK-wide broadcast of the series, concluding that "the whole country deserves to see the fabulous Baker Boys". To coincide with the shows second run of episodes on BBC Wales The Radio Times published an article by Gareth McClean also arguing in favour of a nationwide broadcast. McLean states:

The first series achieved strong viewing figures, being the second most-watched original broadcast on BBC Wales with an average of 294,000 viewers during the 2010/2011season. In 2012 the series received five nominations at the 21st annual Bafta Cymru award ceremony. Eve Myles and Mark Lewis Jones were nominated respectively for the Best Actress and Actor awards, whilst Helen Raynor and Gary Owen received a joint nomination for Best Writing and Mark Waters received a nomination for Photography and Lighting. The series received one award; with Adam Lewis winning an award for Best Original Music.

References

External links
 
 

2010s Welsh television series
2011 British television series debuts
2011 British television series endings
BBC Cymru Wales television shows
BBC high definition shows
BBC television dramas
2010s British television miniseries
English-language television shows
Television shows set in Wales